The Columbo statue is a life-sized bronze work on Falk Miksa Street in Budapest depicting Peter Falk in the role of the fictional police detective Columbo. At the Columbo statue's feet is a statue of Columbo's dog, Dog. The statues, by the sculptor Géza Dezső Fekete, were put up in 2014 as part of a state-sponsored urban renewal project.

Though Peter Falk and the street's namesake, 19th century Hungarian politician Miksa Falk, were both Jewish, and the actor Peter Falk had ancestors from Hungary, there is no known family relationship between them. The actor's Hungarian connection was not through the Falk family on his father's side, but through his maternal grandfather.

Gallery

References 

Columbo
Monuments and memorials in Hungary
Statues in Hungary
2014 sculptures
Buildings and structures in Budapest